Moses Chavula (born 8 August 1985) is a Malawian footballer who plays as a defender for ENH de Vilankulos.

A longtime member of the Malawi national football team, Chavula has competed for his national team since 2003. Chavula is a left-footed player and plays as left-back for his team and Malawi.

References

1985 births
Living people
People from Blantyre
Malawian footballers
Malawi international footballers
2010 Africa Cup of Nations players
Silver Strikers FC players
Mighty Wanderers FC players
Nathi Lions F.C. players
AmaZulu F.C. players
C.D. Maxaquene players
CD Costa do Sol players
Vilankulo F.C. players
Malawian expatriate footballers
Expatriate soccer players in South Africa
Malawian expatriate sportspeople in South Africa
Expatriate footballers in Mozambique
Malawian expatriate sportspeople in Mozambique
Association football fullbacks